Above All is the first full-length album by Swedish heavy metal band Mustasch. The album which was released in 2002, peaked at No. 22 on the
Swedish albums charts.

Track listing 
"Down in Black" – 2:45
"I Hunt Alone" – 3:17
"Into The Arena" – 5:13
"Muddy Waters" – 3:29
"Ocean Song – Orust" – 5:47
"Sympathy For Destruction" – 3:14
"Teenage Pacifier" – 4:08
"Insanity Walls" – 4:36
"White Magic" – 4:22
"The Dagger" – 5:14

References

2002 debut albums
Mustasch albums